The Plava is a river in Tula Oblast, Russia, a right tributary of the Upa. The town of Plavsk is situated on the Plava.

References

Rivers of Tula Oblast